Azaribine (triacetyl-6-azauridine) is a drug which was developed for the treatment of psoriasis, and also has anti-cancer and antiviral actions. It is a prodrug which is metabolised to the nucleoside analogue 6-azauridine in the body. Azaribine was approved for clinical use in treatment of psoriasis, but subsequently withdrawn because of toxicity issues, however it continues to be researched as a potential agent for the treatment of emerging viral diseases.

References 

Antiviral drugs
Triazines
Tetrahydrofurans
Esters
Ketones